Canities subita, also called Marie Antoinette syndrome or Thomas More syndrome, is an alleged condition of hair turning white overnight due to stress or trauma. The trivial names come from specific cases in history including that of Queen Marie Antoinette of France whose hair was noted as having turned stark white overnight after her capture following the ill-fated flight to Varennes during the French Revolution. An older case of Sir Thomas More's hair turning white the night before his beheading has also been recorded.  Although a number of cases of rapid hair greying have been documented, the underlying patho-physiological changes have not been sufficiently studied.

Causes 
The syndrome has been hypothesized to be a variant of alopecia areata diffusa or autoimmune non-scarring hair loss that selectively affects all pigmented hairs, leaving only the white hair behind. Marie Antoinette syndrome is caused by high levels of emotional stress, which, in turn, causes less pigmentation of the hair. These form the basis of most uses of the idea in fictional works. It has been found that some hairs can become colored again when stress is reduced.

One study with experiments on mice found that stress caused white hair even if the immune system was suppressed (ruling out auto-immune response) and if the glands producing cortisol were removed. The study concluded that over-activation of the sympathetic nervous system was causing stem cells to stop producing pigment cells in hair follicles.

History
The earliest surviving recorded claim of sudden whitening of the hair is represented in the Talmud, by a story of a Jewish scholar who, at the age of 17 years, developed white hair locks due to overwork.

Contemporary cases of accelerated hair-whitening have been documented, as with bombing victims in the Second World War, and in a case covered in the medical journal Archives of Dermatology in 2009.

References 

Autoimmune diseases
Conditions of the skin appendages
Syndrome
Syndromes